is a Prefectural Natural Park in Chiba Prefecture, Japan. First designated for protection in 1935, the park extends along some sixty kilometres of the coast between the Minami Bōsō and  Suigo-Tsukuba Quasi-National Parks. The park spans the borders of twelve municipalities: Asahi, Chiba, Chōsei, Chōshi, Ichinomiya, Kujūkuri, Ōamishirasato, Sanmu, Shirako, Sōsa, Tōgane, and Yokoshibahikari.

See also
 National Parks of Japan
 Kujūkuri Beach

References

External links
  Map of Kujūkuri Prefectural Natural Park (north)
  Map of Kujūkuri Prefectural Natural Park (south)

Parks and gardens in Chiba Prefecture
Protected areas established in 1935
1935 establishments in Japan